The Raketenjagdpanzer (RakJPz 3) Jaguar 1 was a West German tank destroyer equipped with anti-tank guided missiles. From 1978 to 1982, 316 obsolete Raketenjagdpanzer 2 units were converted into Jaguar 1s by replacing the SS.11 missile system with a HOT launcher and upgrading the armour. From 1993 to 1995, new optics and a thermal imaging system were added to create the Jaguar 1A3.

References

External links
 FAS, Jaguar 1

Tank destroyers of Germany
Military vehicles introduced in the 1970s